NASN School Nurse is an American bimonthly peer-reviewed nursing journal that covers the field of school nursing. The editor-in-chief is Cynthia Galemore. It was established in 2001 and is currently published by SAGE Publications in association with the American National Association of School Nurses. The editorial board selects issue themes for feature articles while also providing regular sections such as asthma/allergies, diabetes/endocrine, healthy lifestyles, immunizations/infectious disease, political/legal issues, screenings/referral, and special needs.

Abstracting and indexing 
The journal is abstracted and indexed in:

External links 
 
 National Association of School Nurses

SAGE Publishing academic journals
English-language journals
General nursing journals
Bimonthly journals
Publications established in 2001